Knislinge is a locality situated in Östra Göinge Municipality, Scania County, Sweden with 3,030 inhabitants in 2010.

Knislinge Church is a well-preserved medieval church, containing a large number of medieval frescos.

References 

Populated places in Östra Göinge Municipality
Populated places in Skåne County